The Société Générale des Transports Aériens (SGTA) was a French airline founded in 1919. It operated until 1933 when its assets were incorporated in the newly created Air France airline.

History
Initially known as the Lignes Aériennes Farman (Farman airlines), the SGTA was created on February 8, 1919, when a Farman F.60 Goliath flew from Toussus-le-Noble to Kenley, near Croydon. The airline was created by the Farman brothers, who also owned the Farman Aviation Works.

In 1933, all SGTA assets were incorporated in the newly created Air France, and the company ceased to exist.

Accidents and incidents
On 5 May 1927, Farman F.60 Goliath F-ADFN was lost in the Atlantic Ocean on a flight from Saint-Louis Senegal to Pernambuco, Brazil. Both crewmen were killed.

Aircraft
The airline operated Farman aircraft exclusively, including these types:
 Farman F.60 Goliath - 12-14 passengers
 Farman F.70 - 4 passengers
 Farman F.121 Jabiru - 9 passengers
 Farman F.170 Jabiru - 8 passengers

References

Defunct airlines of France
Airlines established in 1919
Airlines disestablished in 1933